Edward James Dawkins (born 11 July 1989) is a New Zealand track cyclist. At the 2010 Commonwealth Games he won the silver medal in the men's sprint and the bronze medal in the men's 1 kilometre time trial. At the 2014 Commonwealth Games, he won the bronze medal in the men's sprint, and was part of the New Zealand time that won the gold medal in the team sprint, with Ethan Mitchell and Sam Webster.  The team sprint team set two Commonwealth Games records along the way.  At the 2016 Rio Olympics, he won alongside Sam Webster and Ethan Mitchell a silver medal in the team sprint, but did not go beyond the round 1 repechage in the individual sprint.

At the 2018 Commonwealth Games, Dawkins won gold in the team sprint event alongside Ethan Mitchell and Sam Webster.

He had previously competed at the 2012 Summer Olympics.

Dawkins retired from professional cycling in 2020, and took up the sport of powerlifting. In 2022, he was selected to represent New Zealand at the Commonwealth Powerlifting Championships in Auckland.

Major results
2017
1st Team Sprint, UCI World Track Championships
1st Sprinters Omnium, Six Day London

References

1989 births
Living people
New Zealand male cyclists
Commonwealth Games bronze medallists for New Zealand
Commonwealth Games gold medallists for New Zealand
Commonwealth Games medallists in cycling
Commonwealth Games silver medallists for New Zealand
Cyclists at the 2010 Commonwealth Games
Cyclists at the 2012 Summer Olympics
Cyclists at the 2014 Commonwealth Games
Cyclists at the 2016 Summer Olympics
Cyclists at the 2018 Commonwealth Games
Medalists at the 2016 Summer Olympics
Olympic cyclists of New Zealand
Olympic medalists in cycling
Olympic silver medalists for New Zealand
Cyclists from Invercargill
New Zealand powerlifters
UCI Track Cycling World Champions (men)
New Zealand track cyclists
20th-century New Zealand people
21st-century New Zealand people
Medallists at the 2014 Commonwealth Games
Medallists at the 2018 Commonwealth Games